Perito Moreno is a town in the northwest of Santa Cruz Province, Argentina, 25 km east of Lake Buenos Aires.  It should not be confused with the Perito Moreno National Park over 300 km south by road, or the Perito Moreno Glacier near El Calafate. The town is the capital of the Lago Buenos Aires Department. It lies on the RN43, a paved road which links Caleta Olivia on the Atlantic coast to Los Antiguos and the Chilean frontier 60 km west, and Ruta 40, running north and south.

The town is a centre of cattle ranches and smallholdings producing fruit and vegetables.  Tourism is also an important industry.  Perito Moreno is the closest town to Cueva de las Manos, 170 km south by road, and Parque Laguna.

In the 2010 census the town had a population of 4,617.

History 
The town was founded in 1910, as a rest stop for travellers by the springs which give rise to the Rio Deseado.  The place was called Pari-Aike (meaning "place of reeds") by the Tehuelche, but the town was officially called Nacimiento in 1927.  The name was changed in 1944 to Lago Buenos Aires, and in 1952 to Perito Moreno, after the explorer Francisco Moreno.

Climate 

Perito Moreno has a cold semi-arid climate (Köppen climate classification: BSk), bordering on a cold desert climate (Köppen climate classification: BWk).

Buildings 
The town is home to the Carlos J. Gradin Museum of Archaeology, named after Carlos J. Gradin. As of 2019, the building is still under construction.

Culture 
Perito Moreno is widely considered the archaeological capitol of Santa Cruz, largely due to how close it is to Cueva de las Manos. Every year in February, the town celebrates a festival of Cueva de las Manos.

See also 

References

Notes

External links 

Populated places in Santa Cruz Province, Argentina